In Greek mythology, Demoleon (Ancient Greek: Δημολέων) was a Trojan warrior, son of Antenor and Theano. His father was a counselor to King Priam and his mother was a priestess of Athena.

Family 
Demoleon was the brother of Crino, Acamas, Agenor, Antheus, Archelochus, Coön, Eurymachus, Glaucus, Helicaon, Iphidamas, Laodamas, Laodocus, Medon, Polybus,  and Thersilochus. Demoleon was the grandson of Thracian king Cisseus and Telecleia through his maternal side.

Mythology 
Demoleon was a tough defensive fighter that was killed by Achilles during the Trojan War. Born into a peaceful family that believed that Helen should be sent back to the Greeks.and his house was spared by the Achaeans because his family received Odysseus and Menelaus when they came to Troy as envoys. Demoleon's house was also spared by the Achaeans because his father pleaded with the Trojans to return Helen to the Greeks when Paris first stole her from Menelaus. It is believed that his family founded the city of Patavium (Padua) after fleeing Troy."…and over [the body of Iphition] Achilles killed Demoleon, a valiant champion of war and son to Antenor. He struck him on the temple through his bronze-cheeked helmet. The helmet did not stay the spear, but it went right on, crushing the bone so that the brain inside was shed in all directions, and his lust of fighting was ended."

Namesake 
 18493 Demoleon, Jovian asteroid

Note

References 

 Apollodorus, The Library with an English Translation by Sir James George Frazer, F.B.A., F.R.S. in 2 Volumes, Cambridge, MA, Harvard University Press; London, William Heinemann Ltd. 1921. ISBN 0-674-99135-4. Online version at the Perseus Digital Library. Greek text available from the same website.
 Dictys Cretensis, from The Trojan War. The Chronicles of Dictys of Crete and Dares the Phrygian translated by Richard McIlwaine Frazer, Jr. (1931-). Indiana University Press. 1966. Online version at the Topos Text Project.
 Homer, The Iliad with an English Translation by A.T. Murray, Ph.D. in two volumes. Cambridge, MA., Harvard University Press; London, William Heinemann, Ltd. 1924. . Online version at the Perseus Digital Library.
 Homer, Homeri Opera in five volumes. Oxford, Oxford University Press. 1920. . Greek text available at the Perseus Digital Library.
 Pausanias, Description of Greece with an English Translation by W.H.S. Jones, Litt.D., and H.A. Ormerod, M.A., in 4 Volumes. Cambridge, MA, Harvard University Press; London, William Heinemann Ltd. 1918. . Online version at the Perseus Digital Library
 Pausanias, Graeciae Descriptio. 3 vols. Leipzig, Teubner. 1903.  Greek text available at the Perseus Digital Library.
 Publius Vergilius Maro, Aeneid. Theodore C. Williams. trans. Boston. Houghton Mifflin Co. 1910. Online version at the Perseus Digital Library.
 Publius Vergilius Maro, Bucolics, Aeneid, and Georgics. J. B. Greenough. Boston. Ginn & Co. 1900. Latin text available at the Perseus Digital Library.
 Tzetzes, John, Allegories of the Iliad translated by Goldwyn, Adam J. and Kokkini, Dimitra. Dumbarton Oaks Medieval Library, Harvard University Press, 2015.

External links 
 Demoleon, Minor Planet Center

Trojans
People of the Trojan War